The Beitou Presbyterian Church is a presbyterian church in Beitou District, Taipei, Taiwan.

History
The church was established in 1912 by George Leslie Mackay.

Architecture
The church was designed by Canadian Presbyterian missionary William Gauld. It was constructed with red bricks and wooden frame.

Transportation
The church is accessible within walking distance east of Beitou Station of Taipei Metro.

See also
 Christianity in Taiwan

References

1912 establishments in Taiwan
Churches in Taipei
Churches completed in 1912